Baron Charles Gustave Martin de Chassiron (1818-1871) was a French diplomat of the 19th century. He travelled to China and Japan as one of the two Attachés of the French Embassy under Baron Gros, with the title of "Detaché extraordinaire en Chine et au Japon" from 1858 to 1860, together with Marquis Alfred de Moges.

Chassiron wrote an account of his travels Notes sur le Japon, la Chine et l'Inde: 1858-1859-1860.

During his travels, Chassiron built a large collection of Japanese and Chinese artifacts which are displayed today at the Orbigny-Bernon Museum in La Rochelle.

The Chassiron lighthouse at the northern tip of Ile d'Oléron was named after him.

He was the first husband of Princess Caroline Laetitia Murat (firstborn of Prince Napoleon Lucien Charles Murat, son of Caroline Bonaparte): they got married in Paris, 6 June 1850. They had a son, Guy de Chassiron (1863-1932). After his death his widow remarried that same year with a wealthy Englishman, John Lewis Garden, and had two daughters from him.

He was the father of famous dancer Emma Livry

See also
 France–Japan relations (19th century)

Works
 Aperçu Pittoresque de la Régence de Tunis
 Notes sur le Japon, la Chine et l'Inde 1858-1859-1860

Notes

19th-century French diplomats
1818 births
1871 deaths
Ambassadors of France to Japan
Diplomats from Nantes